Carlazzo is a comune (municipality) in the Province of Como in the Italian region Lombardy, located about  north of Milan and about  north of Como.

Carlazzo borders the following municipalities: Bene Lario, Corrido, Cusino, Grandola ed Uniti, Porlezza, San Bartolomeo Val Cavargna, San Nazzaro Val Cavargna, Val Rezzo.

Demographic evolution

References

Cities and towns in Lombardy